Pottem Vari Palli is a village in the Sodam Mandal in Chittoor district of the state of Andhra Pradesh.

References 

Villages in Chittoor district